Thomas Joseph Callan (July 12, 1853 – May 5, 1908) was a United States Army soldier who received the Medal of Honor for his bravery during the Battle of Little Big Horn in 1876.

Biography
Callan was born in County Louth, Ireland on July 12, 1853, and joined the US Army in March 1876.

He had served just three months as a Private in Company B, 7th United States Cavalry, at the time of his actions. He received the Medal of Honor for his bravery at the Battle of Little Big Horn, Montana Territory, on June 25, and June 26, 1876. His medal was issued on October 24, 1896.

He died on May 5, 1908, and was buried in Holy Sepulchre Cemetery, East Orange, New Jersey.

Medal of Honor citation
Rank and organization: Private, Company B, 7th U.S. Cavalry. Place and date. At Little Big Horn, Mont., 25-June 26, 1876. Entered service at: Boston, Mass. Birth: Ireland. Date of issue: October 24, 1896.

Citation:

Volunteered and succeeded in obtaining water for the wounded of the command; also displayed conspicuously good conduct in assistlng (sic) to drive away the Indians.

See also

List of Medal of Honor recipients
List of Medal of Honor recipients for the Indian Wars

Notes

References

1853 births
1908 deaths
People from County Louth
19th-century Irish people
Irish soldiers in the United States Army
Irish emigrants to the United States (before 1923)
United States Army Medal of Honor recipients
People of the Great Sioux War of 1876
United States Army soldiers
Irish-born Medal of Honor recipients
American Indian Wars recipients of the Medal of Honor
Burials at Holy Sepulchre Cemetery (East Orange, New Jersey)